Blandine Lachèze (born October 11, 1982 in Fontainebleau, Seine-et-Marne) is a female modern pentathlete from France. She competed at the 2004 Summer Olympics in Athens, Greece, where she finished nineteenth in the women's event, with a score of 4,988 points.

Lachèze won an individual gold medal at the 2003 Asian Open Championships in Kaohsiung, Chinese Taipei, and a relay bronze at the  2004 World Modern Pentathlon Championships in Moscow, Russia.

References

External links
  (archived page from Pentathlon.org)

Sportspeople from Fontainebleau
1982 births
Living people
French female modern pentathletes
Olympic modern pentathletes of France
Modern pentathletes at the 2004 Summer Olympics
World Modern Pentathlon Championships medalists